Ante is masculine given name found mainly in Croatia and in the Nordic countries.

Ante is a common Croatian name, among the top 100 names in Croatia, with over thirty thousand bearers. In Croatia, the name Ante was among the top ten most common masculine given names in the decades up to 1959.
It is cognate to the name Antun, in turn derived from the Roman gentile name Antonius. It started to spread through the veneration of Anthony the Great and esp. of Anthony of Padua. Other cognates include Anton, Antonije, Anto, Toni, Tonko, Tonči, Antonija, etc.

Ante is also a Swedish male first name, unrelated to the names that derive from Antonius, and instead is a diminutive form of Anders and Andreas.

Croatian etymology 

Ante Bukvić (born 1987), Croatian-Luxembourgish footballer
Ante Covic (born 1975), Australian footballer
Ante Delaš (born 1988), Croatian basketball player
Ante Đugum (born 1988), Croatian basketball player
Ante Erceg (born 1989), Croatian footballer
Ante Gotovina (born 1955), Croatian general
Ante Jazić (born 1976), Canadian footballer
Ante Jelavić (born 1963), Bosnian-Croat politician
Ante Juric (born 1973), Australian football
Ante Kosovich (1879–1958), Croatian-New Zealand writer
Ante Kovacevic (born 1974), Australian footballer
Ante Kovačić (1854–1889), Croatian writer
Ante Marković (1924–2011), Yugoslav-Croatian politician
Ante Milanovic-Litre (born 1994), Canadian footballer 
Ante Milicic (born 1974), Australian footballer
Ante Miročević (born 1952), Montenegrin footballer
Ante Mladinić (1929–2002), Croatian football manager
Ante Moric (born 1974), Australian footballer
Ante Mrduljaš (1910–1997), Yugoslav-Croatian politician
Ante Pavelić (1869–1938), Croatian politician
Ante Pavelić (1889–1959), Croatian leader and first President 
Ante Peterlić (1936–2007), Croatian screenwriter and film director
Ante Radonić (born 1951), Croatian astronomer
Ante Razov (born 1974), American footballer
Ante Rebić (born 1993), Croatian footballer
Ante Roguljić (born 1996), Croatian footballer
Ante Roje (1905–1980), Croatian swimmer
Ante Šimundža (born 1971), Slovenian footballer
Ante Tomić (basketball) (born 1987), Croatian basketball player
Ante Tomić (writer) (born 1970), Croatian writer
Ante Trstenjak (1894–1970), Slovenian, psychologist, painter and illustrator
Ante Starčević (1823–1896), Croatian politician and writer 
Ante Šupuk (1838–1904), Croatian politician and inventor
Ante Žanetić (1936–2014), Croatian footballer
Ante Žižić (born 1997), Croatian basketball player in the Israeli Basketball Premier League

Nordic people named Ante
Ante Aikio (born 1977), Finnish-Sami linguist
Ante Björkebaum (born 1988), Swedish footballer
Ingor Ánte Áilo Gaup (born 1960), Sámi actor, composer, and folk musician

Other people
Ante Zelck (born Andreas Zelck, 1963), German entrepreneur and hostel pioneer

See also

 Antė, a Lithuanian name
Ant (name)
Antes (name)
Anth (name)

References

Croatian masculine given names
Swedish masculine given names
Masculine given names